Burrow Hill Cider Farm is a cider farm in Somerset, England at the base of Burrow Hill overlooking the Somerset Levels.

It has views of most of South Somerset on clear days. The cider is made in traditional vats and uses age old traditional methods of production. Every October is "Apple Day" when the apples are harvested from locally owned orchards.

In 2003 the company won the NFU Great British Food Award.

Cider Bus
Burrow Hill Cider has a 'Cider Bus' at the Glastonbury Festival selling a variety of cider-based drinks, including Hot Spiced Cider.

Somerset Cider Brandy 
Somerset Cider Brandy is an apple brandy that has been in written records as far back as 1678. A modern version was first produced by Burrow Hill in 1987. It reportedly became the first legal distillery in Somerset for 150 years, when, in 1989, the farm received the first full cider-distilling licence ever issued by the UK's HM Customs and Excise.

References

Further reading
 James Crowden, Cider: The Forgotten Miracle, Cyder Press Two (1999),  - includes the story of the early days of Somerset Cider Brandy

External links
 Company website

Somerset ciders
Brandies
Tourist attractions in Somerset